Mackie is an American professional audio products brand. Founded in Seattle in 1988 by Greg Mackie as a manufacturer of affordable and versatile compact pro audio mixers, Mackie is the primary product line of LOUD Technologies.

History
Mackie Designs, Inc. was founded in Woodinville, Washington by Greg Mackie, an ex-Boeing worker who began making pro audio gear and guitar amps in his spare time. After founding the small line mixer manufacturer TAPCO, and later the home audio processor manufacturer AudioControl, Mackie founded Mackie Designs, Inc., designing and manufacturing affordable and versatile compact pro audio mixers under the Mackie brand in his three bedroom condominium in Edmonds, Washington. Mackie's first product was the LM-1602 line mixer, priced at $399.

Following the moderate sales success of the LM-1602, the company moved to a true factory in 1991 to produce and release its follow-up model, the CR-1604. With the flexibility to be used as either a desktop or rackmount mixer (a new concept at the time) combined with solid performance and competitive price, the CR-1604 was purchased for use in a wide variety of markets and applications. The CR-1604 became a tremendous success, selling hundreds of thousands of units by 1996 and accounting for over 48% of Mackie's overall revenues at that time.

During this time, Mackie remained squarely in the mixer category, introducing 8-Bus mixing consoles for multitrack recording and live sound production in 1993. Mackie took advantage of the Seattle area's plentiful electronic and engineering subcontractors and utilized automated assembly machines to achieve high productivity and quality with lower overall production costs. At the time, the company was growing more than 100 percent annually, forcing Mackie to relocate and expand manufacturing every year, and by 1994 Mackie had grown into a 30,000 square-foot factory to accommodate over 250 employees and US$35.5 million in annual revenues.

In 1995 Mackie celebrated the milestone of having sold its 100,000th mixer and moved into a 90,000 square-foot factory. The company completed an initial public stock offering, and introduced the Ultra-mix Universal Automation System for 8-bus consoles at the AES Convention later that year.

By 1996, Mackie was diversifying, adding veteran industry designer Cal Perkins to the team and diversifying into power amps, powered mixers, and active studio monitors. In 1999, benefiting from Mackie Designs' acquisition of Radio Cine Forniture S.p.A., Mackie introduced the SRM450 powered loudspeaker, and by 2001, speakers accounted for 55% of Mackie sales.

Name change
In 2003, company management renamed Mackie Designs, Inc. as LOUD Technologies, Inc. (now known as LOUD Audio) to avoid confusion between the parent company and the Mackie brand.

See also 
 List of studio monitor manufacturers
 Mackie 1604-VLZ Pro

References

External links 

 Mackie's website

1988 establishments in Washington (state)
American companies established in 1988
Electronics companies disestablished in 1988
Loudspeaker manufacturers
Music equipment manufacturers
Audio amplifier manufacturers
Audio mixing console manufacturers
Audio equipment manufacturers of the United States
Manufacturing companies based in Seattle
Consumer electronics brands
LOUD Audio